Nassarius agapetus is a species of sea snail, a marine gastropod mollusc in the family Nassariidae, the nassa mud snails or dog whelks.

Description
The shell grows to a length of 6.5 mm

Distribution
This species is distributed in the Red Sea, in the Indian Ocean off Réunion and in the Indo-West Pacific.

References

 Cernohorsky W. O. (1984). Systematics of the family Nassariidae (Mollusca: Gastropoda). Bulletin of the Auckland Institute and Museum 14: 1–356.
 Vine, P. (1986). Red Sea Invertebrates. Immel Publishing, London. 224 pp.

External links
 

Nassariidae
Gastropods described in 1882